Social Call is an album by saxophonist Charlie Rouse and trumpeter Red Rodney which was recorded and released on the Uptown label in 1984.

Reception

The AllMusic review by Scott Yanow stated "Old friends Rouse and Rodney work off each other very well, and the results are swinging and enjoyable".

The authors of The Penguin Guide to Jazz Recordings called the album "a fine showing from the saxophonist," and praised Dailey's contribution, stating that he is "hugely authoritative... and plays with relaxed power."

David Franklin of Jazz Times noted that Rouse's "appealing, distinctive tone, his clipped, inventive phrasing and his forceful swing-all characteristics" are "clearly in evidence" on the album, and called Rodney "a fine intuitive player" who "never fails to swing infectiously while crafting steadfastly melodic lines."

Track listing
 "Little Chico" (Charlie Rouse) – 6:20
 "Social Call" (Gigi Gryce) – 5:46
 "Half Nelson" (Miles Davis) – 6:29
 "Greenhouse" (Bobby Porcelli) – 4:44
 "Darn That Dream" (Jimmy Van Heusen, Eddie DeLange) – 9:31
 "Casbah" (Tadd Dameron) – 6:11

Personnel
Charlie Rouse - tenor saxophone
Red Rodney – trumpet, flugelhorn
Albert Dailey – piano
Cecil McBee – bass
Kenny Washington – drums
Don Sickler - arranger

References

Uptown Records (jazz) albums
Red Rodney albums
Charlie Rouse albums
1984 albums
Albums recorded at Van Gelder Studio